The Houla Region or Houla Plain ( Al-Ḥūla) is an area consisting of three villages in the  Homs Governorate of central Syria, northwest of the city of Homs. The biggest village in the Houla region had 20,041 inhabitants in 2004 and is called Kafr Laha. The second largest village, Taldou, had 15,727 inhabitants in 2004 and is located in the outskirts of Houla. The third village, Tell Dahab had 12,055 inhabitants in 2004. The settlement is essentially a Turkmen Sunni Muslim town, where Turkish language is widely spoken among its people. Houla is also surrounded by Alawite neighboring villages. Many of the inhabitants of the Houla village cluster are of Turkmen descent.

Houla was described by 19th-century English scholar Eli Smith as a low-lying tract of land situated at the eastern slope of the Syrian Coastal Mountain Range. The 13th-century Syrian geographer Yaqut al-Hamawi visited al-Houla in 1226 during Ayyubid rule noting that the place belonged to Jund Hims ("military district of Homs").

On 29 April 2022, a water canal built by FAO was inaugurated in the region, which would bring water from Taldou dam to the agricultural lands there, after an 11-year hiatus due to the Syria civil war.

References

Bibliography

Homs Governorate
Plains of Syria
Turkmen communities in Syria
Turkish-speaking territories in Syria

zh:侯拉镇